The Denmark men's national handball team is controlled by the Danish Handball Association and represents Denmark in international matches. They are the team with the fourth most medals won in European Championship history on the men's side behind Sweden, France and Spain, with a total of seven medals. Two of these are gold medals (2008, 2012), one silver (2014) and four bronze medals (2002, 2004, 2006 & 2022).

As of January 2023 they are triple defending World Champions. Defending their 2019 World Championship title at the 2021 World Championship in Egypt, they became only the fourth country to successfully defend a World Championship title. (The other three being Sweden, Romania and France). 

By winning the World Championship in 2023, they became the first team on the men's side, to win three World Championship titles in a row, winning in 2019, 2021 & 2023.

They are also the only team to have won nineteen national matches in a row without losing at a World Championship tournament from 2019-2021, surpassing the eighteen match winning streak by France. In January 2023, they became the first team ever, to not lose at 28 games in a row at the World Championships spanning from 2019-present, beating the previous record by France who had a 25 winning streak set between 2015-2019.

As of January 2021, they are the fourth most successful team in World Championship history behind France, Sweden and Romania, having won seven medals. Three of these are gold (2019, 2021, 2023), three silver (1967, 2011, 2013) and one bronze (2007).

History
Handball is the second most popular pastime in Denmark, only exceeded by football. At the end of 2003, the Danish Handball Association had more than 146,000 active and passive members.

2007 World Championship
In 2007 Denmark participated in the World Championship in Germany, where they were pitted in Group E against Angola, Hungary and their neighbors to the north Norway.
Denmark finished second in their group after victories against Angola and Norway. In the main round the team faced Croatia, the Czech Republic, Russia, Hungary and defending champions Spain.

Despite an initial defeat against Croatia, the team advanced by defeating their last three opponents. In the quarterfinal Iceland was defeated by the narrowest of margins, 42–41. In the semi-final Denmark lost to Poland 36–33 and ended up in the bronze match against France, which they won 34–27 thus placing third.

Denmark's pivot Michael V. Knudsen was added to the All Star Team of the tournament.

2008 European Championship
After finishing third in three consecutive European Championships, the Danish team won gold at the 2008 European Men's Handball Championship, which took place in neighboring Norway. The team lost only one match on the way to gold in a fiercely contested derby against hosts Norway. The Danish team defeated Croatia 24–20 in the final after inching out Germany in the semis. Keeper Kasper Hvidt and winger Lars Christiansen were important factors in the Danish campaign, both being selected for the tournament all-star team and Lars Christiansen also finishing as shared top goalscorer.

2010 European Championship
As defending champions, Denmark was a favorite to reclaim the title. However, they did not succeed, losing matches to both Iceland and Croatia. Instead of advancing to the main-round Denmark ended up playing for fifth place against Spain. They won the placement match 34–27.

2011 World Championship
At The 2011 World Men's Handball Championship, after winning nine consecutive matches, Denmark reached the final beating Spain 28:24 in the semi-final. This was the first time in over 44 years, that the Denmark National Handball Team reached a World Championship final. In the final, Denmark lost against France 35:37 in overtime. This meant at the time, that France was able to hold all three major titles as reigning European Champions, Olympic Champions and also double World Champions.

2012 European Championship
Denmark came to the 2012 European Men's Handball Championship as vice World Champions and as one of the pre-favorites to win the tournament. However, in the main group, Denmark lost to both Serbia and Poland, proceeding to the main round with zero points, having only won against Slovakia. This meant that Denmark had to win all of their matches and at the same time, they had to rely on other results in order to advance to the semi-finals. Miraculously, results from other matches were in favor of Denmark. The destiny of Denmark's survival lay in the hands of Poland as Poland had to win against Germany in order to sustain Denmark's survival in the tournament. After a fierce and close match between Poland and Germany, Poland won 33–32. This meant that Denmark only had to beat Sweden in their final main round match, and they would go through to the semi-finals. Denmark beat Sweden by a large margin, 31–24, making handball history along the way, becoming the first team ever, both on the men's and women's side in European Championship history to advance to the semi-finals having carried zero points into the main round.

Like the 2011 World Men's Handball Championship, Denmark met Spain in the semi-finals, a match Denmark won 25–24. In the other semi-final, hosting nation Serbia met Croatia, a match Serbia won 26–22.

In a low scoring match, Denmark won their second European Championship title after beating Serbia 21–19 in the final, thus becoming the first handball team ever claiming the European Championship title having carried zero points into the main round.

2013 World Championship
Despite having disappointed at the 2012 Olympics in London, Denmark was still among the top teams to win the World Champions title. As defending European Champions, Denmark was seated with Russia, Iceland, Macedonia, Qatar and Chile in Group B. Winning all of their matches, they advanced safely to the 16th round where they had to meet Tunisia. Having no problems defeating Tunisia with the score of 30–23, Denmark reached the Quarterfinals where Hungary awaited. After a splendid first half, leading 18–11, the second half was a more close affair, though Denmark managed to win 28–26, reaching the semi-finals for the second consecutive time in this tournament. In the semi-finals, Denmark was seated with Croatia who had beaten the defending World Champions, France, in their semi-final. Though the odds where in favor of Croatia, Denmark played their best match in the 2013 World Championship so far, winning 30–24 and securing their second consecutive World Championship final.

In the final, Denmark was up against hosting nation, Spain. The final became a horrendous game for Denmark, losing with a record-breaking 16 goals, and losing the title for the second time in a row, with Spain declared as winner of the tournament for the second time in history.

2014 European Championship
As vice world champions, defending European Champions and the advantage of home court, Denmark were among the favorites to win the tournament. They won all of the matches in the preliminary round as well as the main round easily advancing to the semi-finals. Denmark met Croatia in the semi-final. They beat Croatia, 29–27, but lost to the French national team in the finals, losing 41–32. This was the second time in a row, that Denmark lost a Championship, losing to Spain at the 2013 World Championship.

2019 World Championship
Denmark along with Germany co-hosted the 2019 World Championship and played in Group C with Norway, Tunisia, Chile, Austria and Saudi Arabia. started with a victory over Chile and remained undefeated. Then played in Group II in the main round the first match with a win over Hungary, also undefeated, played in the semi-finals. A win over six-time world champions France put them in the final. Denmark won world championship title with a 31–22 victory over Norway in the final.

2021 World Championship
Denmark qualified for the 2021 World Championship in Egypt as defending champions. They went undefeated and won the second successive world title. They also became the only team, to win nineteen national matches in a row at World Championship tournaments from 2019-2021, surpassing the eighteen winning streak by France.

2025 World Championship
Denmark along with Croatia and Norway will co-host the 2025 World Championship, it will be the third time Denmark co-host the tournament, they are automatically qualified as co-host

Honours

Competitive record
 Champions   Runners-up   Third place   Fourth place

Olympic Games
The team did not participate in the 1936 field handball tournament at the Olympics, but lost at the 1952 Olympics in a demonstration match against Sweden.

World Championship

European Championship

*Denotes draws include knockout matches decided in a penalty shootout.
**Gold background color indicates that the tournament was won. Red border color indicates tournament was held on home soil.

Team

Current squad
The squad for the 2023 World Men's Handball Championship in Poland and Sweden.

Matches and goals are correct as of 19 December 2022.

Head coach: Nikolaj Jacobsen

Coaching staff

Statistics

Most capped players
 

Top scorers
 
As of the 2023 World Championship.

Kit suppliers
Between 2003 and 2006, Denmark's kits were supplied by Adidas. Since 2007 the kits have been supplied by Puma.

Sponsors
The current sponsor of the Danish Handball Team is Norlys.

References

External links

IHF profile

Handball in Denmark
Men's national handball teams
Handball